Independent Medical College Faisalabad (or IMCF) is a private sector medical college based in Faisalabad District of Punjab province of Pakistan.

Recognized college
This college is recognised by the Pakistan Medical and Dental Council and is affiliated with the University of Health Sciences, Lahore, Pakistan.

This college teaches the students for 5 years which leads the students to be awarded an MBBS degree.

Teaching hospital affiliated with the college is:
Independent University Hospital

Pre-Clinical Departments 
Biochemistry
Anatomy
Physiology
Forensic Medicine
Pathology
Pharmacology
Community Medicine

Clinical Departments 
Surgery
Gynaecology and Obstetrics
Medicine 
Paediatrics
Ophthalmology 
Ear, Nose and Throat 
Orthopedics

Others 
Department of continuous Professional Development
Department of Information Technology

Independent University Hospital 
Independent University Hospital is the teaching hospital of Independent Medical College, Faisalabad. It is a 560-bed general hospital in the heart of thickly populated area of the city of Faisalabad.

References 

Universities and colleges in Faisalabad District
Medical colleges in Punjab, Pakistan
Faisalabad
2008 establishments in Pakistan